Garfield Township, officially the Charter Township of Garfield, is a charter township of Grand Traverse County in the U.S. state of Michigan. As of the 2020 census, the township had a total population of 19,499.

Garfield Township is the largest municipality in Northern Lower Michigan by population. Much of the township is suburban, due to its proximity to Traverse City. It is one of four charter townships in the Traverse City micropolitan area; the others being Elmwood Township in Leelanau County, and East Bay and Long Lake townships in Grand Traverse County.

History 
The first two townships of Grand Traverse County were organized in 1853; the Old Mission Peninsula was assigned to Peninsula Township, with its present-day boundaries, and the rest of the county, including Traverse City, was assigned to Traverse Township. However, it was renamed in 1882 in honor of recently assassinated president James A. Garfield. It is one of six townships named Garfield in Michigan, but the only one that is a charter township.

Geography

The Boardman River flows from south to north in the east of the township. The township's largest lake, Silver Lake is in the southwest of the township, and is shared to the south with Blair Township. 

Two lines of the Great Lakes Central Railroad run through the east of the township, paralleling the Boardman River on either side.

Adjacent municipalities 
All townships listed are part of Grand Traverse County, unless otherwise stated.

 Elmwood Charter Township, Leelanau County (north)
 Traverse City (northeast)
 East Bay Charter Township (east)
 Blair Township (south)
 Green Lake Township (southwest)
 Long Lake Charter Township (west)

Major highways 
 US Highway 31 and M-37 share a concurrency through the township as a major north–south thoroughfare.
 M-72 is an east–west highway that runs along the northern boundary of the township, along the Leelanau County line. The highway traverses the entire Lower Peninsula, with termini at Empire on Lake Michigan and Harrisville on Lake Huron.

Communities
Brookside is a small community outside Traverse City.
Kratochvil's Plat is a former resort community on the northwestern shore of Silver Lake.
The city of Traverse City is immediately adjacent Garfield Township (to the northeast), and, prior to incorporation, was part of Garfield Township.

Demographics
As of the census of 2010, there were 16,256 people, 7,367 households, and 4,040 families residing in the township. The racial makeup of the township was 93.87% White, 0.80% African American, 1.18% Native American, 1.06% Asian, 0.04% Pacific Islander, 0.67% from other races, and 2.37% from two or more races. Hispanic or Latino of any race were 2.45% of the population.

There were 7,367 households, out of which 22.3% had children under the age of 18 living with them, 40.8% were married couples living together, 10.8% had a female householder with no husband present, and 45.2% were non-families. 37.5% of all households were made up of individuals, and 17.6% had someone living alone who was 65 years of age or older. The average household size was 2.16 and the average family size was 2.83.

In the township the population was spread out, with 20.1% under the age of 18, 9.1% from 18 to 24, 23.1% from 25 to 44, 27.3% from 45 to 64, and 20.4% who were 65 years of age or older. The median age was 43 years. For every 100 females, there were 84.4 males. For every 100 females age 18 and over, there were 80.7 males.

The median income for a household in the township was $41,712, and the median income for a family was $55,977. Males had a median income of $30,167 versus $23,672 for females. The per capita income for the township was $26,390. About 10.1% of families and 14.3% of the population were below the poverty line, including 20.9% of those under age 18 and 5.6% of those age 65 or over.

Education 
Traverse City Area Public Schools (TCAPS) serves the entirety of Garfield Township. Secondary students within the east of the township are zoned to Traverse City Central High School, while secondary students within the west of the township are zoned to Traverse City West Senior High School. The latter is located within Garfield Township. TCAPS also operates Traverse City West Middle School and Silver Lake Elementary School within the township.

References

External links
Charter Township of Garfield

Townships in Grand Traverse County, Michigan
Charter townships in Michigan
Traverse City micropolitan area
1853 establishments in Michigan